Bradley Slater (born 23 September 1998) is a New Zealand rugby union player who plays for the  in Super Rugby. His playing position is hooker. He was named in the Chiefs squad for week 3 in 2019.

Reference list

External links
itsrugby.co.uk profile

New Zealand rugby union players
Living people
Rugby union hookers
1998 births
Taranaki rugby union players
Chiefs (rugby union) players
Rugby union players from New Plymouth